Elections to Colchester Borough Council  took place on 5 May 1994. This was on the same day as other local elections across the United Kingdom.

At the election, the Liberal Democrats gained control of the council from no overall control, becoming the first party other than the Conservatives to control the council since its creation in 1973.

Summary

Ward results

Berechurch

No Green candidate as previous (1.0%).

Birch Messing Copford

Castle

Harbour

Lexden

No Green candidate as previous (0.8%).

Mile End

New Town

Prettygate

Pyefleet

Shrub End

St. Andrew's

St. Anne's

No Green candidate as previous (1.1%).

St. John's

No Green candidate as previous (2.8%).

St. Mary's

Stanway

Tiptree

No Tiptree Residents candidate as previous (46.3%).

West Bergholt & Eight Ash Green

West Mersea

Winstree

Wivenhoe

References

1994
1994 English local elections
1990s in Essex